Tribhuvan University (TU) is a public university located in Kirtipur, Kathmandu. Established in 1959, TU is the oldest university in Nepal. In terms of enrollment, it is the 12th largest university in the world. The college offers 1000 undergraduate and 500 postgraduate programs across a wide range of disciplines. Additionally, the institution has 30 constituent campuses and over 600 affiliated colleges across the country.

History
Established on 25 June 1959 (or 11 Ashar 2016 BS), Tribhuvan University is the oldest and largest university in Nepal. The university was named after the late King Tribhuvan. In its early years, all the postgraduate classes were held at Tripureshwor Campus. The administrative office was also located in Tripureshwor. It was only in 1967 that the university was relocated to its main campus in Kirtipur – an ancient town about 5km south-west of the city of Kathmandu. The university, which spreads over an area of 154.77 hectares, constitutes the Central Administrative Office and the Central Campus.

TU marked its golden jubilee in 2009.

Academics

Since its inception, the state-owned university has expanded its programmes. There are five technical institutes and four general faculties. The university offers 115 courses for the technical proficiency certificate level. TU offers 1079 courses at Bachelor's level and 1000 courses at Master's level. It offers PhD degrees in the technical institutes and faculties.

Tribhuvan University ran its programmes only through its constituent campuses before 1980. With the increasing number of students seeking higher education, it was not possible to accommodate all the students in the constituent campuses. This situation led to the establishment of colleges in the private sector because the constituent campuses alone could not meet the demand. From 1979 to 1980, TU started providing affiliation to private colleges. As of April 2016, 1,084 private and public colleges were affiliated with TU.

In the 2014–2015 academic session 405,341 students were enrolled in TU academic programmes. 148,141 (36.55%) students study in its 60 constituent campuses including 38 central departments, while 257,200 (63.45%) students study in 1,053 affiliated colleges.

TU has 7,841 teaching faculty and 7,413 non-teaching staff including the support staff in its constituent campuses. The number of total employees is 15,254.

Rankings
Tribhuvan University is ranked in the top 800-1000 universities in the world as per the Times Higher Education World University Rankings in 2021, published by the Times Higher Education (THE) magazine. It is ranked among the 251-300 best universities of Asia. It is ranked at 6676 in the world and 2nd in the country as per the 4icu Organisation of University Ranking.

Technical institutes
The university administers its science and technology programs, such as BSc, BE, MBBS, etc., through its technical institutes. There are five technical institutes at the university, each taking care of a specific domain within the field of science and technology education.
 Institute of Agriculture and Animal Science (IAAS)
 Institute of Medicine (IOM)
 Institute of Engineering (IOE)
 Institute of Science and Technology (IOST)
 Institute of Forestry (IOF)

Faculties and associated Central Departments
There are four faculties and a total of 40 associated central departments at the university:

Constituent Campuses

The following is a partial list of constituent colleges of the university:

Province 1 
 Mahendra Ratna Multiple Campus, [Ilam District|Ilam]
 Model Campus, Jhapa
 Mechi Multiple Campus, Jhapa
 Damak Multiple Campus, Jhapa 
 Mahendra Morang Adarsh Multiple Campus, Biratnagar	
 Snatakottar Campus(Postgraduate Campus), Biratnagar	
 Nursing Campus, Biratnagar	
 Purwanchal Campus, Dharan	
 Mahendra Multiple Campus, Dharan	
 Central Campus of Technology, Dharan	
 Dhankuta Multiple Campus, Dhankuta	
 Tehrathum Multiple Campus, Chuhandanda, Terhathum	
 Bhojpur Multiple Campus, Bhojpur	
 Mahendra Bindeshwori Multiple Campus, Rajbiraj	
 Panchthar Multiple Campus, (Panchthar)
 Pathari Multiple Campus, Pathari Shanishchare

Madhesh Province 
 Dumarwana Multiple Campus, Dumarwana Bara 
 Ramshwaroop Ramsagar Multiple Campus, Janakpur	
 Thakur Ram Multiple Campus, Birgunj	
 National Academy Campus, Birgunj		
 SSYM Campus, Siraha
• Janajyoti Multiple Campus, Lalbandi Sarlahi

Mahendra bindeshwori multiple campus Rajbiraj

Bagmati Province 
 Hetauda Campus, Hetauda
 Kathmandu  Shiksha Multiple Campus, Chandragiri municipality, Satungal
 Bhaktapur Multiple Campus, Bhaktapur	
 Sanothimi Campus, Bhaktapur	
 Patan Samyukta Campus, Patan Dhoka	
 Pulchowk Campus, Pulchowk	
 Nepal Commerce Campus, Min Bhawan	
 Thapathali Campus, Thapathali	
 Jana Prasashan Campus, Jamal	
 University Campus, Kirtipur	
 Mahendra Ratna Campus, Tahachal	
 Ayurved Campus, Kirtipur	
 Public Youth Campus, Dhobichaur	
 Saraswoti Multiple Campus, Lainchaur	
 Amrit Campus, Lainchaur	
 Central Campus, Maharajgung	
 Nursing Campus, Maharajgunj	
 Lalitkala Campus, Bhotahiti	
 Trichandra Multiple Campus, Ghantaghar	
 Padmakanya Multiple Campus, Bagbazar	
 Shanker Dev Campus, Putalisadak	
 Ratna Rajya Lakshmi Campus, Pradarshani Marg, Kathmandu
 Nepal Law Campus, Pradarshani Marg	
 Bishwa Bhasa Campus, Pradarshani Marg
 Birendra Multiple Campus, Chitwan

Gandaki Province 
 Gorkha Campus, Gorkha	
 Lamjung Campus, Sundarbazar	
 Paschimanchal Campus, Pokhara
 Mirmee Multiple Campus, MirmeeMirmee Multiple Campus , Mirmee, Syangja
 Pokhara Nursing Campus, Pokhara	
 Pokhara Campus, Pokhara		
 Prithivi Narayan Campus, Pokhara	
 Dhaulagiri Campus, Baglung
 Janapriya Multiple campus, Pokhara

Lumbini Province 
 Tribhuvan Multiple Campus, Palpa	
 Butwal Multiple Campus, Butwal	
 Paklihawa Campus, Paklihawa	
 Bhairahawa Multiple Campus, Bhairahawa	
 Bhairahawa Namuna Campus, Bhairahawa
 Mahendra Multiple Campus, Dang	
 Rapti Babai Campus, Tulsipur, Dang
 Mahendra Multiple Campus, Nepalgunj
 Siddhartha Campus, Kapilvastu
 Sworgadwari multiple campus Pyuthan

Karnali Province 
 Surkhet Campus, Birendranagar	
 Jumla Campus, Jumla
 Musikot Multiple Campus, Rukum

Sudurpaschim Province 
 Doti Multiple Campus, Doti	
 Dadeldhura Campus, Dadeldhura	
 Siddhanath Science Campus, Mahendranagar
 Jagannath Multiple Campus, Baitadi
 Krishna Snatak Campus, Darchula
 Mahakali Multiple Campus, Kanchanpur

Organization

TU is government financed but still an autonomous organization. The head of the government, the prime minister, is its chancellor.

 Chancellor: Prime Minister of Nepal (Puspa Kamal Dahal 'Prachanda") 
 Pro-Chancellor: Minister of Education (Shishir Khanal) 
 Vice Chancellor: Prof. Dr. Dharma Kant Baskota 
 Rector: Prof. Dr. Shiva Lal Bhusal 
 Registrar: Prof. Dr. Peshal Dahal

Council
Tribhuvan University has five decision-making bodies:

 The University Council is the supreme body that makes decisions on policies, budget, rules and regulations and the formation of special committees and commissions.
 Executive Council implements operational decisions while the University Council accepts donations to the university. It makes decisions on grants, affiliation to private campuses and appointments of university officials.
 The Academic Council makes decisions on policies and practices regarding curriculum, teaching, examinations and research.
 The Research Coordination Council makes policies on TU research activities, approves guidelines for researchers and coordinates the functions of university level research organizations.
 The Planning Council has an advisory role of preparing plans (long- and short-term), developing annual programs and evaluating programs implementation.

Facilities
 Tribhuvan University International Cricket Ground
 Tribhuvan University Central Library

Societies
 Nepal Chemical Society
 Nepal Mathematical Society
 Nepal Physical Society

Research centers
Tribhuvan University has the following research centers:
Centre for Economic Development and Administration (CEDA)
Centre for Nepal and Asian Studies (CNAS), formerly called the Institute for Nepal and Asian Studies (INAS)
Research Centre for Applied Science and Technology (RECAST)
Research Centre for Educational Innovation and Development (CERID)

Notable alumni

 Pushpa Kamal Dahal - Prime Minister of Nepal. 
Arjun Narasingha KC - 5-time former Minister and Nepali Congress party leader completed his master's degree in political science at TU 
 Gagan Thapa - former Health minister and popular Youth Leader who studied Sociology at TU
Sushma Shakya - award-winning visual artist
Sharada Sharma - writer
Udayraj Khanal - scientist (Physics)
Binil Aryal -  scientist (Physics)

References

 
Universities and colleges in Nepal
Educational institutions established in 1959
Education in Kathmandu
1959 establishments in Nepal